The Nigerian-German Chamber of Commerce, formerly known as Nigerian-German Business Association was created in 1986 to foster bilateral trade between Nigeria and Germany. The Nigerian-German Business Association (NGBA) creates a bilateral relationship between the countries and aims at strengthening their business opportunities through adequate networking, investment promotion and trade.

Nigeria is Germany's biggest trading partner in the West African sub-region.

Companies who are members of the NGBA have access to the AHK, part of the German Chambers of Commerce, in 120 locations and 80 countries across five continents.

International trade organizations
Chambers of commerce in Nigeria